The Sovereign Base Areas Police is the local civilian police force for the British controlled Sovereign Base Areas (SBA) of Akrotiri and Dhekelia in Cyprus.

Duties
Established in August 1960, the force has responsibility for all 15,000 residents of the SBAs, including military personnel. The Cyprus Joint Police Unit (the Royal Navy Police, Royal Military Police and RAF Police), has concurrent jurisdiction over all offences committed by service personnel and UK dependents/employees within the SBAs, garrisons, and stations, and other retained military sites outside the SBAs.

Both work in full cooperation with each other and any jurisdiction issues are managed through an agreed memorandum of understanding.

Numbers
The SBA Police consists of a total of 241 officers and 12 civilian employees. There are four British senior officers, with the remainder recruited from the Greek Cypriot and Turkish Cypriot communities. In addition to its regular policing duties, the SBA Police has responsibility for the operation of HMP Dhekelia (the SBA Prison).

Affiliation
Although the SBA Police is administered by the Ministry of Defence, it is a separate force from the Ministry of Defence Police (MDP).

See also
Sovereign Base Areas Customs
Cyprus Police
Gibraltar Defence Police

References

External links

Armed Forces Act 2006

Police forces of British Overseas Territories and Crown Dependencies
Sovereign Base Areas
Civilian police forces of defense ministries
Akrotiri and Dhekelia
1960 establishments in Cyprus
1960 establishments in the British Empire